Narayanganj-4 is a constituency represented in the Jatiya Sangsad (National Parliament) of Bangladesh since 2014 by Shamim Osman of the Awami League.

Boundaries 
The constituency encompasses Fatulla and Siddhirganj thanas.

History 
The constituency was created in 1984 from the Dhaka-31 constituency when the former Dhaka District was split into six districts: Manikganj, Munshiganj, Dhaka, Gazipur, Narsingdi, and Narayanganj.

Ahead of the 2008 general election, the Election Commission redrew constituency boundaries to reflect population changes revealed by the 2001 Bangladesh census. The 2008 redistricting altered the boundaries of the constituency.

Ahead of the 2014 general election, the Election Commission reduced the boundaries of the constituency. Previously it had included five union parishads of Narayanganj Sadar Upazila: Baktaballi, Enayetnagar, Fatullah, Kashipur, and Kutubpur.

Members of Parliament

Elections

Elections in the 2010s 

 	
Shamim Osman was elected unopposed in the 2014 general election after opposition parties withdrew their candidacies in a boycott of the election.

Elections in the 2000s

Elections in the 1990s

References

External links
 

Parliamentary constituencies in Bangladesh
Narayanganj District